German submarine U-420 was a Type VIIC U-boat built for the Kriegsmarine for service during World War II. She was laid down in the Danziger Werft as yard number 121, launched on 18 August 1942 and commissioned on 16 December the same year under Oberleutnant zur See Peter Högqvist. She then joined the 8th U-boat Flotilla for training before transferring to the 11th flotilla for operations.

Design
German Type VIIC submarines were preceded by the shorter Type VIIB submarines. U-420 had a displacement of  when at the surface and  while submerged. She had two shafts and two  propellers.

U-420 was fitted with five  torpedo tubes (four fitted at the bow and one at the stern), fourteen torpedoes, one  SK C/35 naval gun, 220 rounds, and two twin  C/30 anti-aircraft guns. The boat had a complement of between forty-four and sixty.

Service history

First patrol
U-420s first patrol involved her leaving Kiel on 12 June 1943 and arriving at Lorient in occupied France on 16 June 1943, having hugged the Norwegian coast and sailed around the north of Scotland. She then crossed the Atlantic, but was attacked on 3 July by a Canadian B-24 Liberator. The boat was hit by a Fido homing torpedo which killed two men and wounded a third. The boat sustained enough damage to force the patrol to be cut short.

Second patrol and loss
Following a short transit voyage from Lorient to Brest, U-420 set off on her second patrol on 9 October 1943. After 20 October, she was never heard from again.

Previously recorded fate
A postwar assessment stated that U-420 was sunk on October 26, 1943 in the North Atlantic at position  by depth charges from a Canadian B-24 Liberator of RCAF Squadron 10/A. This attack was actually against , inflicting no damage.

References

Bibliography

External links

Missing U-boats of World War II
1942 ships
Ships built in Danzig
U-boats commissioned in 1942
U-boats sunk in 1943
German Type VIIC submarines
World War II submarines of Germany
U-boats sunk by unknown causes
Maritime incidents in October 1943